Hedvig Tersmeden (née Wegelin 31 October 1766 – 18 August 1842) was a Swedish noblewoman, Swedish artists' model, known for being the depicted woman in a painting by Carl Fredrik von Breda named Hedvig Wegelin with daughters.
Hedvig Wegelin is a direct ancestor of the Hereditary Princess of Liechtenstein.

Biography 
Wegelin was born into a bourgeoisie Stockholm family on 31 October 1766. She was the daughter of Johan Wegelin, a native of Swedish Livonia, and Hedvig Schméer. She moved from Stockholm to the estate of Hinseberg, but later died in Kägleholm. 
On December 18, 1783, Hedvig Wegelin married ironmaster Jacob Niclas Tersmeden in the parish of Näsby in Örebro County. In 1793, Jacob Niclas purchased Hinseberg and Kägleholm, with the help of the wife's inherited fortune.

In the following years, Wegelin and Tersmeden had four children:

 Jacob Johan Tersmeden (1785 – 1858)
 Carl Reinhold Tersmeden (1789 – 1855)
 Hedvig Elisabeth af Flodin (1790 – 1827)
 Maria Charlotta Ghan (1792 – 1816)

When her husband had passed away in 1822, Hedvig, now a widow, moved to Kägleholm, where she saw the necessity of starting a village school in Ödeby parish. The school was housed in the remaining parts of the old castle and the students were taught geography and history.

References 

1766 births
1842 deaths
People from Stockholm
Swedish people of Latvian descent
Swedish people of German descent
18th-century Swedish nobility